David Schurmann is a film director, producer, screenwriter, explorer, author, speaker, CEO and public figure.

Career
Schurmann, best known for Little Secret Brazil's official 2017 Oscar entry, first showed his passion for filmmaking at age 13 when he began filming the adventures during the Schurmann Family first circumnavigation of the globe. He received his formal training in film and television in New Zealand. He received his formal training in film and television in New Zealand. He then completed his education in the United States. He has worked internationally as a director and producer of feature films, television programs and documentaries.

As producer/director/cinematographer of the Schurmann Family Adventures, he has filmed around the world, most notably during the Magellan Global Adventure (1997–2000).

In 2007, Schurmann released his first feature film, The World Twice Around, a documentary that won two awards at the Recife Film Festival in Brazil, for Best Film and Best Sound Editing. The film also received the Best Film Award at the CineBrasil Film Festival Buenos Aires (Argentina), Milan (Italy), Rome (Italy) and New York City (USA0. The film was broadcast on the Discovery Channel and is currently available on Netflix.

In 2011 he released Missing, a transmídia project and suspense/horror mockumentary film. he project, developed and shot for less than $35,000, questions what is real on the Internet and social networks. The film became a transmídia success story.

Between 2009 and 2012, he produced and directed the documentary and series U-513 Lonely Wolf, about the great search and discovery of the German submarine German submarine U-513 sunk in the coast of southern Brazil.

David then directed and produced the feature film (fiction) Little Secret based on the story of Katherine Schurmann, his adopted sister. The film, which he worked on for six years, became Brazil's official Oscar representative in 2017 and had a successful run at the box office. It is available on Amazon Prime Video.

In 2017, the National Geographic Channel released the 11-part series Orient Expedition which David Schurmann directed and produced.

In 2017, Schurmann and his family founded Voice of the Oceans  and officially launched it on August 29, 2021, after four years of development. The global initiative to fight plastic pollution in the oceans includes a nautical expedition, a science project, an open innovation program, and an education project. With the global support of the UN Environment Program (UNEP), the initiative seeks innovative solutions and raises awareness by asking people around the world to take transformative action.

In 2022, he directed "The Penguin & The Fisherman" a major international production starring Jean Reno , Adriana Barraza  and with photography by Anthony Dod Mantle and production design by Mercedes Alfonsin.

Schurmann is a film director and producer, CEO, author, speaker and chairman of the board of Schurmann Group.

Selected filmography
 Voice of the Oceans Expedition - documentary series (Canal Off) 2022.
 U-513 Lonely Wolf - documentary feature (film) 2021 (to be released).
 Orient Expedition - documentary series (National Geographic - 11 episodes) 2017.
 Little Secret - fiction feature (film) 2015/2016.
 Missing - fiction feature (film) 2011.
 The World Twice Round - documentary feature (film) 2007.
 Magellan Global Adventure - documentary series (film & TV) 1996–2005.
 Get Real - series (TV) 1996.
 Em Busca Do Sonho - documentary feature (film) 1995

Selected books
 Ao Vento - non-fiction book 2009.
 Da Inspiração à Tela - a jornada de um filme - non-fiction, filmmaking book 2020.

References

External links
 
 Voice of the Oceans initiative website
 U-513 film website
 Schurmann Family Official Webpage
 Production company website

1974 births
Living people
Brazilian film directors
Brazilian people of German descent

pt:Família Schürmann